J.W. Ross can refer to:

 Jeanne W. Ross (born ca. 1958), American organizational theorist
 John William Ross (1878–1925), United States federal judge